Lepturinae, the lepturine beetles, is a subfamily of the longhorn beetle family (Cerambycidae), containing about 150 genera worldwide. This lineage is most diverse in the Northern Hemisphere. Until recently the subfamily Necydalinae was included within the lepturines, but this has been recently recognized as a separate subfamily. Nine tribes are usually recognized today, with a tenth, Caraphiini, created in 2016. A few genera are of uncertain placement within the subfamily.

Usually among the smaller members of their family, these beetles are of a slender shape – particularly the thorax is markedly less wide than the wings, while the elytra tips are often pointed. They differ from most other longhorn beetles in that the antennae are not directly adjacent to the compound eyes. Hence, the latter are generally oval in outline, rather than having an indentation where the antennae originate, or even being divided by them. In addition, sexual dichromatism is not infrequently seen in lepturines; usually, longhorn beetles are not dimorphic or only have longer antennae in males.

Tribes and genera
Lepturinae contains the following genera:

Tribe Caraphiini
 Caraphia Matsushita 1933 Noctileptura Chemsak & Linsley, 1984

Tribe Desmocerini Blanchard, 1845
 Desmocerus Dejean 1821

Tribe Encyclopini LeConte, 1873
 Encyclops Newman 1838
 Leptalia LeConte 1873

Tribe Lepturini Latreille, 1802
Selected genera:
 Alosternida Podany 1961
 Analeptura Linsley & Chemsak 1976
 Anastrangalia Ohbayashi 1963
 Anoplodera Pic 1901
 Bellamira LeConte 1873
 Brachyleptura Casey 1913
 Cerrostrangalia Hovore & Chemsak 2005
 Charisalia Casey 1913
 Chontalia Bates 1872
 Choriolaus Bates 1885
 Cyphonotida Casey 1913
 Dorcasina Casey 1913
 Eurylemma Chemsak & Linsley 1974
 Euryptera Lepeletier & Audinet-Serville in Latreille 1828
 Fortuneleptura Villiers 1979
 Grammoptera Audinet-Serville 1835
 Idiopidonia Swaine & Hopping 1928
 Judolia Mulsant 1863
 Leptochoriolaus Chemsak & Linsley 1976
 Leptura Linnaeus 1758
 Lepturobosca (Cosmosalia) Casey 1913
 Lepturopsis Linsley & Chemsak 1976
 Lycidocerus Chemsak & Linsley 1976
 Lycochoriolaus Linsley & Chemsak 1976
 Lycomorphoides Linsley 1970
 Lygistopteroides Linsley & Chemsak 1971
 Macrochoriolaus Linsley 1970
 Megachoriolaus Linsley 1970
 Meloemorpha Chemsak & Linsley 1976
 Mimiptera Linsley 1961
 Mordellistenomimus Chemsak & Linsley 1976
 Nemognathomimus Chemsak & Linsley 1976
 Neoalosterna Podany 1961
 Neobellamira Swaine & Hopping 1928
 Neoleptura Thomson 1860
 Orthochoriolaus Linsley & Chemsak 1976
 Ortholeptura Casey 1913
 Pachytodes Pic 1891
 Pseudophistomis Linsley & Chemsak 1971
 Pseudostrangalia Swaine & Hopping 1928
 Pseudotypocerus Linsley & Chemsak 1971
 Pygoleptura Linsley & Chemsak 1976
 Stenelytrana Dejean 1837
 Stenostrophia Casey 1913
 Stenurella Rosenhauer, 1856
 Stictoleptura Casey 1924
 Strangalepta Casey 1913
 Strangalia Dejean 1835
 Strangalidium Giesbert 1997
 Strophiona Casey 1913
 Trachysida Casey 1913
 Trigonarthris Haldeman 1847
 Trypogeus Lacordaire, 1869
 Typocerus LeConte 1850
 Xestoleptura Casey 1913

Tribe Oxymirini Danilevsky, 1997
 Neoxymirus Miroshnikov 2013
 Oxymirus Mulsant 1862

Tribe Rhagiini Kirby, 1837
 Acmaeops LeConte 1850
 Acmaeopsoides Linsley & Chemsak 1976
 Akimerus Audinet-Serville, 1835 
 Anthophylax LeConte 1850
 Apiocephalus Gahan, 1898
 Brachysomida Casey 1913
 Brachyta Fairmaire 1868
 Centrodera LeConte 1850
 Comacmaeops Linsley & Chemsak 1972
 Cortodera Mulsant 1863
 Enoploderes LeConte 1862
 Evodinus LeConte 1850
 Gaurotes LeConte 1850
 Metacmaeops Linsley & Chemsak 1972
 Neanthophylax Linsley & Chemsak 1972
 Pachyta Dejean 1821
 Pidonia Thomson 1864
 Piodes LeConte 1850
 Pseudogaurotina Plavilstshikov 1958
 Rhagium Fabricius 1775
 Stenocorus Reitter 1912
 Tomentgaurotes Podany 1962

Tribe Rhamnusiini Sama, 2009
 Neorhamnusium Hayashi 1976
 Rhamnusium Latreille 1829

Tribe Sachalinobiini Danilevsky, 2010
 Sachalinobia

Tribe Teledapini Pascoe, 1871

Tribe Xylosteini Reitter, 1913
 Leptorhabdium Kraatz 1879
 Pseudoxylosteus Sama 1993

Incertae sedis
 †Leptura longipennis (nomen dubium; does not belong to Leptura)

References

 

Articles containing video clips